Antonio Vargas (born August 15, 1996) is an American professional boxer.

Early life
Vargas was born in Houston, Texas to a Puerto Rican father, José, and a Mexican mother. He was raised in Kissimmee, Florida.

Amateur career
Vargas won a gold medal at the 2015 Pan American Games in the flyweight event.

He competed at the 2016 Summer Olympics, losing in the round of 16 to Shakhobidin Zoirov of Uzbekistan.

Professional boxing record

References

External links

Antonio Vargas profile at Top Rank

1996 births
Living people
American male boxers
People from Kissimmee, Florida
Sportspeople from Greater Orlando
American people of Puerto Rican descent
American people of Mexican descent
Flyweight boxers
Pan American Games gold medalists for the United States
Boxers at the 2015 Pan American Games
Olympic boxers of the United States
Boxers at the 2016 Summer Olympics
Boxers from Florida
Pan American Games medalists in boxing
Medalists at the 2015 Pan American Games